Mark Farina (born March 25, 1969 in Chicago, Illinois, USA) is an American disc jockey and musician, known for his Chicago house, acid jazz and downtempo works. His notable releases include Mood (KMS Records, 1989) and the Mushroom Jazz series (Om Records, 1996–2011), and recently known also from house compilations El Divinio. He is primarily identified with the house music scene based in San Francisco, California. Farina currently resides in Dallas, Texas.

Biography 
Shortly after Farina became friends with Derrick Carter in 1988 at a record store in Chicago, he developed an interest in house music. Farina experimented with a deeper style, dropping De La Soul, disco classics and other styles not being played in the main rooms of nightclubs. While exploring purist forms of house music, Farina developed his trademark style, known as "mushroom jazz": acid jazz infused with the West Coast's jazzy, organic productions along with urban beats.

Fans embraced Farina's downtempo style, and he started in 1992 a weekly Mushroom Jazz club night in San Francisco with Patty Ryan. In 3 years at the club, Farina and Mushroom Jazz established a following. When the club closed, Farina continued the tradition by releasing a series of CDs under the same name, Mushroom Jazz. Since then, he has been performing hundreds of shows worldwide each year. His house sets have been described as the jazzy side of Chicago House mixed San Francisco style. Some of his sets have been known to last up to 8 hours. Farina has been known to play two different rooms at the same party. URB, MUZIK and BPM magazines have all had him on their 'Top DJs in the World' lists. In 2000, Farina was ranked at number 72 on the DJ Mag Top 100 DJs list.

Discography (selected releases)
 Geograffiti EP (Great Lakes Audio)
 Mushroom Jazz series
 Mushroom Jazz 8 (Innercise/MRI)
 Mushroom Jazz 7 (Innercise/MRI)
 Mushroom Jazz 6 (Om)
 Mushroom Jazz 5 (Om)
 Mushroom Jazz 4 (Om)
 Mushroom Jazz 3 (Om)
 Mushroom Jazz 2 (Om)
 Mushroom Jazz 1 (Om)
 Fabric 40 (Fabric)
 Live in Tokyo (Om)
 House of OM (Om)
 Sessions (MOS)
 Seasons (Moonshine)
 Imperial Dub (Imperial)
 United DJs of America (DMC)
 San Francisco Sessions (Om)
 Connect (Om)
 Live at Om w/Derrick Carter (Om)
 Air Farina (Om)
 Bes' Enatainment EP (Great Lakes Audio)

References

External links
Website
Om Records biography
Early 1990s Mark Farina mixtapes

1969 births
American DJs
Musicians from Chicago
DJs from Chicago
Living people
Club DJs
American house musicians
Musicians from the San Francisco Bay Area
Deep house musicians
Acid jazz musicians
Electronic dance music DJs